Vladimir Beklemishev may refer to:

 Vladimir Nikolayevich Beklemishev, a Soviet zoologist
 Vladimir Aleksandrovich Beklemishev, a Russian sculptor